Ülo Seppa (10 February 1933 in Tartu – 2015) is an Estonian lawyer and agronomist.

He was a member of Constitutional Assembly of Estonia.

In 2006, he was awarded with Order of the National Coat of Arms, V class.

References

1933 births
2015 deaths
20th-century Estonian lawyers
Estonian agronomists
Voters of the Estonian restoration of Independence
Recipients of the Order of the National Coat of Arms, 4th Class
Politicians from Tartu